Caffeine and Octane's Lanier Raceway (formerly Lanier Raceplex and Lanier National Speedway) is a 0.375-mile paved oval racetrack located just outside Braselton, Georgia.  The track opened in 1982 as a dirt track, and was paved in the mid-1980s. It is currently owned and operated by High Octane, LLC, an auto events & multimedia business conglomerate. The track was under the NASCAR Whelen All-American Series banner with super late models, SuperTrucks, Junkyard Dogs, outlaw late models, mini stocks, INEX RaceCeiver/zMax legends cars and INEX bandolero cars.  The track ended weekly racing at the end of the 2011 season, but remained open for larger events. In 2022, High Octane resumed weekly car events at the raceway for the first time since 2011.

The Pro All Star Series  hosted a national super late model event at Lanier on November 15–16, 2019.  This served as the PASS National Championship final.

 On 1 January 2022 it was reported that the track had been sold to Caffeine and Octane. C&O's Lanier Raceway is located across from the NASCAR owned Road Atlanta motor racing circuit.

History 
In 2014, Lanier National Speedway was purchased by Jim Downing and renamed "Lanier Raceplex". The new venue was to host concerts and serve as a race track  August 12 photos emerged showing the infield walls, buildings, and facilities being razed in preparation for a complete "black lake" paving job of the entire infield and oval.  Track amenities also received major renovations. The track reopened January 2016 and features "arrive and drive" karting, as well as hosting oval track (legends series), and drift events.

In 2021, the Lanier Raceplex functioned as an arrive and drive go-kart track and is hosted a four-race legends car series in July that was broadcast on NBC Sports Gold Trackpass. A ten race series was also held for arrive and drive go karts that year.

In 2022, the now-formerly Lanier Raceplex was sold to High Octane Events, a multimedia motorsports event business headquartered in Atlanta, GA who also own the largest monthly car show in the world, Caffeine and Octane. C&O announced it intends to create a more actively used event space for drifting, racing, burnouts, car meets and other auto events with all makes and models of cars. Caffeine and Octane has resumed weekly events at the Lanier Raceway, including Friday Night Drift with Federico Sceriffo, a professional drifter in the Formula D league, for the first time since 2011.

NASCAR Xfinity Series history 

The NASCAR Busch Grand National Series (now the Xfinity Series) ran five races at the track between 1988 and 1992.

Other major events
Lanier Raceplex hosted weekly NASCAR Whelen All-American Series races.

The track hosted 17 NASCAR Southeast Series races between 1991 and 2004. The track also hosted 2 NASCAR Whelen Southern Modified Tour events: one in 2008 and the other in 2009.

The ARCA Racing Series had run one event at the track, in 2005. The race was won by David Ragan.

The facility hosted three ASA National Tour races between 2000 and 2004. One race was won by Scott Wimmer and the other two events were won by Mike Garvey.

USAR Pro Cup Series ran one race at the track, in 2009.

References

External links

 Official site
Lanier Raceplex race results at Racing-Reference

NASCAR tracks
ARCA Menards Series tracks
Motorsport venues in Georgia (U.S. state)
Buildings and structures in Hall County, Georgia
Tourist attractions in Hall County, Georgia
Defunct motorsport venues in the United States
1982 establishments in Georgia (U.S. state)
Sports venues completed in 1982